Vadakkumkara  is a village in Thrissur district in the state of Kerala, India.

Demographics
 India census, Vadakkumkara had a population of 9007 with 4250 males and 4757 females.

References

Villages in Thrissur district